Parijatha Vaneswarar Temple (பாரிஜாதவனேஸ்வரர் கோயில்)  is a Hindu temple located at Tirukalar in the Tiruvarur district of Tamil Nadu, India. Situated at a distance of about 21 kilometres from Mannargudi on the road to Thiruthuraipoondi, the presiding deity of the temple is Shiva.

Legend 

The sage Durvasa is believed to have worshipped a shivalinga at this place. Shiva appeared to him in the form of Nataraja dancing the thandava.

Significance 
It is one of the shrines of the 275 Paadal Petra Sthalams. Praises of the temple have been sung by the Saivite saints Sambandar and Thirunavukkarasar in the Thevaram. There are shrines to Ganesha, Somaskanda, Murugan, Durga, Lakshmi, Agastya and the 63 Nayanmars.

References

External links 
 

Shiva temples in Tiruvarur district
Padal Petra Stalam